HMS Snapper was a second-batch S-class submarine built during the 1930s for the Royal Navy. Completed in 1935, the boat participated in the Second World War. Snapper is one of the 12 boats named in the song "Twelve Little S-Boats".

Design and description
The second batch of S-class submarines were designed as slightly improved and enlarged versions of the earlier boats of the class and were intended to operate in the North and Baltic Seas. They displaced  on the surface and  submerged. The S-class submarines had a crew of 40 officers and ratings.

For surface running, the boats were powered by two  diesel engines, each driving one propeller shaft. When submerged each propeller was driven by a  electric motor. They could reach  on the surface and  underwater.

The S-class boats were armed with six 21-inch (533 mm) torpedo tubes in the bow. They carried six reload torpedoes for a total of a dozen torpedoes. They were also armed with a 3-inch (76 mm) deck gun.

Construction and career
Ordered on 16 June 1933, Snapper was laid down on 18 September 1933 at HM Dockyard, Chatham and was launched on 25 October 1934. The boat was completed on 14 June 1935.

Snapper spent most of her career in home waters.  She was mistakenly attacked by a British aircraft when returning to Harwich after a patrol in the North Sea. Although suffering a direct hit, Snapper escaped damage.  She went on to sink the small German oil tanker , the German merchant Florida, the German auxiliary minesweepers M 1701 / H. M. Behrens and M 1702 / Carsten Janssen, the German armed trawler V 1107 / Portland and the Norwegian merchant Cygnus.  She also attacked the German armed merchant cruiser , but the torpedoes missed their target.

Sinking

She left the Clyde on 29 January 1941 to patrol in the Bay of Biscay. She should have arrived in her patrol area on 1 February. She was ordered to remain on station until 10 February and then to return with her escort. Snapper failed to make the rendezvous with the escort and was not heard from again. It is believed that she met her fate through a mine or that she was mortally damaged by a minesweeper which attacked a submarine in Snapper'''s area on 11 February, although Snapper'' should have been out of the area by then.

Citations

References

External links

 

British S-class submarines (1931)
Missing submarines of World War II
1934 ships
World War II submarines of the United Kingdom
Lost submarines of the United Kingdom
Ships lost with all hands
Maritime incidents in February 1941
World War II shipwrecks in the Atlantic Ocean
Ships built in Chatham
Submarines sunk by German warships